Sharleen is an English feminine given name that is a diminutive of Charles. Notable people with the name include:

Given name
Sharleen Makusha (born 1997), Zimbabwean netball player 
Sharleen Spiteri (born 1967), Scottish singer and songwriter
Sharleen Spiteri (sex worker) (1967-2005), Australian sex worker
Sharleen Stratton, (born 1987), Australian diver

See also

 Charlene - a similar name
 Sharlee D'Angelo
 Sharlene (an alternative spelling)

Notes

English feminine given names